Dolgiye Borody is a rural locality (a village) in Roshchinskoye Rural Settlement of Valdaysky District, in Novgorod Oblast, Russia. Population: . The presidential residence Dolgiye Borody is located nearby.

References 

Rural localities in Novgorod Oblast